The fourth and final season of the Showcase television series Continuum was officially ordered on December 8, 2014. The season was originally slated to premiere on July 26, 2015, but was  pushed back, and premiered on September 4, 2015 on Showcase Canada. The fourth season, and the series, concluded on October 9, 2015.

The premiere episode was released online by Showcase on August 21, 2015. The series was created by Simon Barry, and centers on Kiera Cameron (Rachel Nichols) as she time travels from 2077 to 2012 in pursuit of a group of terrorists, attempting to find a way home. All episode titles in this season use the word "Hour".

Cast and characters

Regular
 Rachel Nichols as Kiera Cameron
 Victor Webster as Carlos Fonnegra
 Erik Knudsen as Alec Sadler
 William B. Davis as future Alec Sadler
 Stephen Lobo as Matthew Kellog
 Roger Cross as Travis Verta
 Luvia Petersen as Jasmine Garza
 Omari Newton as Lucas Ingram
 Brian Markinson as Inspector Jack Dillon
 Ryan Robbins as Brad Tonkin
 Terry Chen as Curtis Chen

Recurring
 Richard Harmon as Julian Randol
 Ian Tracey as Jason Sadler
 Magda Apanowicz as Emily / Maya Hartwell
 Kyra Zagorsky as Vasquez
 Michael Eklund as Zorin
 Ty Olsson as Marcellus
 Aleks Paunovic as Rollins
 Lisa Berry as Nolan
 Garfield Wilson as Weaver

Episodes

Production
Simon Barry revealed that he had 7–10 seasons in mind to tell the entire story of Continuum, while Rachel Nichols hinted that work had begun into season 4 with a new direction for her character Kiera. At first, the renewal of season 4 was expected in July 2014. With months of silence from Showcase, Syfy confirmed on September 26 that they were unlikely to save Continuum should Showcase choose to cancel it. On December 8, 2014, Showcase renewed the show for a final season of six episodes.

Filming of the fourth and final season began on March 26, 2015.

Broadcast
Continuums premiere episode was released online by Showcase on August 21, 2015. The fourth season began airing on Syfy on September 11, 2015.

Ratings

Reviews
Kristof Stevenson of Superior Realities gave a positive review of the first episode, giving it a score of 8.1 out of 10. He commented that the shorter season allows the episode to never dull and called Emily's fight scene "one of the best fight sequences [he'd] ever seen." On TV.com, MaryAnn Sleasman wrote that the series finale was "phenomenal" and "bittersweet in the best possible way."

Merill Barr of Forbes said, "The action is solid, and watching Rachel Nichols run around in her futuristic super suit is just as entertaining as its always been."

References

2015 Canadian television seasons
4